Igor Viktorovich Kochetkov (born 13 May 1970) is a Russian gay rights activist who heads the Russian LGBT Network.

Kochetkov has been active in the opposition to the 2013 Russian law that bans promotion of homosexuality to minors. He has blamed the law for legitimizing and increasing violence against gays.

In September 2013, Kochetkov along with other Russian human rights activists met with US President Barack Obama in Saint Petersburg.

Along with Alexey Davydov he was named one of the world's 100 top thinkers in 2013 by the magazine Foreign Policy "for fighting Russia's state-sponsored homophobia".

Kochetkov was along with Frank Mugisha, Sunil Babu Pant and ILGA nominated for the 2014 Nobel Peace Prize by Norwegian Labour Parliamentarians Anette Trettebergstuen and Håkon Haugli.

References 

1970 births
Living people
Gay politicians
Russian LGBT rights activists
Russian gay men

Yabloko politicians
People listed in Russia as media foreign agents
Russian activists against the 2022 Russian invasion of Ukraine
Herzen University alumni